The Italian tertiary education institute Sapienza University of Rome is often mononymously referred to as Sapienza.

Sapienza may also refer to:

People
Al Sapienza, American actor
Antonio Sapienza, Italian composer and conductor
Goliarda Sapienza, Italian actress and writer
Paola Sapienza, American economist
Rick Sapienza, American football player
Vincent Sapienza, American civil servant
Vitor Sapienza, Brazilian politician and economist

Other uses
Battle of Sapienza, a 1354 battle which occurred during the Third Venetian–Genoese War
La Sapienza (film), a 2015 dramatic film directed by Eugène Green
Orto Botanico dell'Università di Roma "La Sapienza", a botanical garden operated by the Sapienza University of Rome
Romano & Sapienza, the previous name of Italian musical group Tacabro
Sant'Ivo alla Sapienza, a Roman Catholic church located within the premises of the Sapienza University of Rome
Sapientza, a Greek island located off the southern coast of the Peloponnese near the city of Methóni
Sapienza (Hitman), a fictional town and level from the Hitman video game series
Treaty of Sapienza, a 1209 treaty between the Republic of Venice and the Principality of Achaea
University of Rome Unitelma Sapienza, a private university founded in 2004 in Rome, Italy